Kipps: The Story of a Simple Soul is a 1905 novel by H. G. Wells.

Kipps may also refer to:
 Kipps (1921 film), a 1921 British drama film adaptation of the novel
 Kipps (1941 film), a 1941 comedy film adaptation of the novel
 Kipp's apparatus, an apparatus for preparation of small volumes of gases
 Kipps Run, a tributary of the Susquehanna River in Northumberland County, Pennsylvania
 Kipps family in the 2005 novel On Beauty by British author Zadie Smith

See also
 Kipp (disambiguation)